Ain Al-Tamur Sport Club, is an Iraqi football team based in Karbala, that plays in the Iraq Division Three.

Stadium
On March 11, 2019, the Ministry of Youth and Sports inaugurated the Ain Al-Tamur Stadium, and the opening included a huge public presence.

Managerial history
  Fadhel Saeed
 Falah Al-Mashhadani

See also 
 2021–22 Iraq Division Three
 2022–23 Iraq Division Three

References

External links
 Iraq Clubs- Foundation Dates

2019 establishments in Iraq
Association football clubs established in 2019
Football clubs in Karbala